The Chaland de transport de matériel (CTM) is a French landing craft class, also operated by the navies of Chile, Djibouti, Ivory Coast, Morocco and Senegal. The design is based on the American LCM-8-class landing craft and were initially ordered to support France's nuclear testing in the Pacific. Constructed in two batches, the first batch of 16 vessels have been removed from French service with some transferred to other navies, the others being discarded. The second batch consisting of 17 vessels is split, with some being transferred to other nations and some remaining in service with the French Navy. The remaining vessels in French service are being replaced with a new landing craft design.

Description
The CTMs are landing craft that are derived from the American LCM-8 class. Each ship has a bow ramp. The vessels are propelled by two propellers that were initially driven by two Poyaud 520 V8 diesel engines capable of creating . They were later exchanged for Poyaud-Wärtsilä 18V8M1 diesels creating . They are equipped with a small navigational radar and two  machine guns. The machine guns are often not mounted. The vessels had an initial complement of 6, declining to 4.

Construction and career
The CTMs were constructed in two batches. The first three ships of the first batch were ordered on 18 July 1964. Further orders were placed in 1965 and 1966. The first batch consisting of CTM 1 to CTM 16,  was constructed in the 1960s to support nuclear testing in the Pacific. A second series was ordered in 1982 to replace the older, worn out units. Six units were operated by the French Army, but were returned to the navy in 2010. Several vessels have since been transferred to navies around the world, including Morocco, Senegal, Ivory Coast,  Chile and Brazil while others have been cannibalised for spare parts.

Ships in class

Replacement
A new landing craft was developed by STX France and DCNS, called the CTM NG, with the CTM referring to this class and the NG meaning "Nouvelle Génération". These vessels represent an improved design over the Chaland de transport de matériel.

The remaining CTMs are being gradually replaced from 2021 by fourteen new Engins de débarquement amphibie standard (standard amphibious landing craft) – EDA-S – built by SOCARENAM over a period of ten years. French forces deployed in overseas bases in Mayotte, New Caledonia, Martinique and French Guiana are to receive one vessel each in order to support local operations. Two vessels are also planned to be deployed for operations around Djibouti. The first two EDA-S vessels (Arbalète and Arquebuse) were delivered to the navy in November 2021 and entered service in July 2022. The next four in the program are intended for the naval base at Toulon and are to start delivery in mid-2023. Deliveries will continue up to 2025.

Notes

Citations

References
 
 
 
 

Landing craft
Amphibious warfare vessels of the French Navy
Ship classes of the French Navy